John Downing (born 1936) is an author, reporter, editor and columnist, most notably writing for the Toronto Telegram and later the Toronto Sun.

Journalism
He was editor of the Whitehorse Star in 1957, and reporter and editor on the Toronto Telegram from 1958 to 1971. He was a "Day Oner"  of the Toronto Sun first as city hall columnist and then as the Editor from 1985 to 1997.

Professional Associations
John Downing has been president of the Canadian National Exhibition, Toronto Press Club and Press Clubs of Canada, and director and governor of the Toronto Outdoor Art Show, Runnymede Health Care Centre,  Exhibition Place, Toronto and Region Conservation Authority, Ontario Safety League, Royal Agricultural Winter Fair, and Canada's Sports Hall of Fame.

Safety

He has written chapters for books on the CNE and Toronto politics, two political biographies, and articles for Time, Macleans and other publications. He appeared on the CBC, CityTV, the Global Television Network, CFTR (AM) and CFRB.

Downing has been credited with popularizing the term "Red Rocket" for the Toronto Transit Corporation's (TTC) streetcars.

Images

Chronology
 1957 - Downing joins Whitehorse Star as Editor
 1958 - Downing joins the Toronto Telegram first as Reporter then City Editor and Managing Editor
 1971 - Downing joins the Toronto Sun as a columnist
 1985 - Downing becomes Toronto Sun Editor
 1999 - Downing becomes President of Canadian National Exhibition Association

Publications
 Phillips, Nathan and Downing, John. Mayor of All the People, McClelland & Stewart Canada, 1967.
 Downing, John. "Ryerson University - A Unicorn Among Horses" John Downing (April 17 2017), Canada, 2017.

References

External links 
 John Downing's Blog

1936 births
Canadian columnists
Journalists from Toronto
Toronto Metropolitan University alumni
Living people
Toronto Sun editors